is a Japanese instructor of Shotokan karate. He has won the JKA's version of the world championships for kata. He has also won the JKA All-Japan championships for kata on four occasions, and for kumite on five occasions. He is currently an instructor with the Japan Karate Association.

Biography

Takuya Taniyama was born in Osaka, Japan on 28 June 1965. He studied at Takushoku University. His karate training began during his 3rd year of elementary school.

Competition
Takuya Taniyama has had considerable success in karate competition.

Major Tournament Success
50th JKA All Japan Karate Championship (2007) - 1st Place Kumite
49th JKA All Japan Karate Championship (2006) - 3rd Place Kata
9th Shoto World Cup Karate Championship Tournament (Tokyo, 2004) - 2nd Place Kata
47th JKA All Japan Karate Championship (2004) - 3rd Place Kumite; 3rd Place Kata
46th JKA All Japan Karate Championship (2003) - 1st Place Kata; 3rd Place Kumite
45th JKA All Japan Karate Championship (2002) - Tournament Grand Champion; 1st Place Kata; 2nd Place Kumite
44th JKA All Japan Karate Championship (2001) - Tournament Grand Champion; 1st Place Kumite; 2nd Place Kata
8th Shoto World Cup Karate Championship Tournament (Tokyo, 2000) - 1st Place Kata; 3rd Place Kumite
43rd JKA All Japan Karate Championship (2000) - 1st Place Kata
42nd JKA All Japan Karate Championship (1999) - Tournament Grand Champion; 1st Place Kata; 2nd Place Kumite
41st JKA All Japan Karate Championship (1998) - Tournament Grand Champion; 1st Place Kumite; 3rd Place Kata
7th Shoto World Cup Karate Championship Tournament (Paris, 1998) - 3rd Place Kata
6th Shoto World Cup Karate Championship Tournament (Osaka, 1996) - 3rd Place Kumite
39th JKA All Japan Karate Championship (1996) - 1st Place Kumite
38th JKA All Japan Karate Championship (1995) - 1st Place Kumite
37th JKA All Japan Karate Championship (1994) - 2nd Place Kumite
35th JKA All Japan Karate Championship (1992) - 2nd Place Kumite

References

 

1965 births
Japanese male karateka
Karate coaches
Shotokan practitioners
Sportspeople from Osaka Prefecture
Takushoku University alumni
Living people
20th-century Japanese people
21st-century Japanese people